Mathew John Sadler (born 26 February 1985) is an English former professional footballer. He played as a left-footed defender capable of playing either at full-back or as a centre-back.

Sadler played in the Premier League and the Football League for Birmingham City. He spent most of his career in the Football League, for Northampton Town, Watford, Stockport County, Shrewsbury Town, Walsall, Crawley Town, Rotherham United and Oldham Athletic.

Club career

Birmingham City
Sadler was born in Birmingham, West Midlands. He began his career as a junior with Birmingham City. He made his first team debut on 2 October 2002 in a League Cup second round tie away at Leyton Orient, starting in the 3–2 win at Brisbane Road. A month later, he made his Premier League debut in a 3–1 home win over Bolton Wanderers, again as a starter.

On 21 November 2003, having not played for Birmingham that season, Sadler went on a two-month loan to Northampton Town, playing eight games, seven of which in the Third Division. In May 2004, signed a new contract to keep him at Birmingham. However, Sadler suffered ankle and football problems.

On 7 February 2006, having not played for Birmingham since 28 December 2002 nor any team since 10 January 2004, Sadler made his return in a 2–1 home win over Reading in an FA Cup fourth round replay, coming on for Mathew Birley after 59 minutes. This was his only appearance until 1 April when he was in the first team to play Chelsea at home, a goalless draw. He stayed in the starting line-up for the remaining games, as the season ended with relegation. At the end of the 2005–06 season, Sadler was awarded the Radio WM Breakthrough Award at the club's annual dinner. Not only that, Sadler signed a two–year contract with the club.

In the 2006–07 season, Sadler began to be first team regular in the left-back position. However, Sadler suffered a groin injury in training, resulting him missing out for four matches. Sadler then made his return to the first team on 30 September 2006, playing 90 minutes, in a 1–1 draw against Leicester City. Sadler played a role in a match against Coventry City on 31 October 2006 when he provided assist for Nicklas Bendtner to score the only goal of the game with a win. After this, Sadler continued to be a first team regular in the left-back position for the remainder of the season until he was dropped from the first team ahead of the match in favour of Stephen Kelly against Barnsley on 9 April 2007. Manager Steve Bruce explained his decision to leave out Sadler of the squad. As a result, Sadler never played again for the remainder of 2006–07 season, as Birmingham City were promoted back to the Premier League. Despite this, Sadler made thirty–six appearances. Nevertheless, Sadler then signed a three–year contract with the club, keeping him until 2010.

In the 2007–08 season saw Sadler suffered a knock and Achilles problem to the start of the season. After missing out the first two matches, Sadler made his first appearance of 2007–08 when he came on as a substitute for Fabrice Muamba in the 80th minute, in a 1–0 loss against West Ham United on 18 August 2007. Sadler then provided assist for Garry O'Connor in the 27th minute, in the first round of League Cup, in a 2–1 win over Hereford United on 28 August 2007. However, Sadler struggled for the first team place after losing his left-back position to Franck Queudrue and Liam Ridgewell. As a result, Sadler was sent to play in the reserve. But in December, Sadler returned to the first team in the left-back position in his first league appearance since December, in a 2–1 loss against Newcastle United on 8 December 2007. However, on his next appearance against Reading, Sadler came under criticism when his back-pass short led to goalkeeper Maik Taylor brought down Stephen Hunt in the penalty box, leading Hunt to take the penalty himself and converted the penalty successfully. After the match, Taylor defended Sadler, stating he could one day bounce back.

After appearing one more appearance, Sadler was left out of the squad once again and attracted interests from clubs around England. Upon joining Watford, Sadler said it was an honour to play for Birmingham City, the team he grew up supporting, and regretted not playing enough games for the club.

Watford
Sadler joined Watford on 24 January 2008 for an initial fee of £750,000, rising to £900,000 depending on appearances. He signed a three-and-a-half-year contract.

Sadler made his Watford debut on 29 January 2008, making his first start for the club, in a 1–1 draw against Sheffield United. Despite the injury, Sadler was the regular in the first team for the remainder of 2007–08 season, making fifteen appearances.

In the 2008–09 season, Sadler started well, appearing for the first three matches to the start of the season until he suffered a lateral knee ligament injury. After missing out five matches, Sadler regained his first team place and then provided assist for Tamás Priskin to score the first goal of the game, in a 3–0 win over Southampton on 18 October 2008. Sadler, once again, sidelined when he suffered an injury that kept him out throughout November. Following his return, Sadler played against his former club, Birmingham City, on 6 December 2008, which saw Watford lost 3–2. Ahead of the match, Sadler stated he hope the club regain back to the Premier League. Sadler eventually fell from grace at Vicarage Road and made his final appearance for Watford on 26 December 2008 in a 2–4 home defeat to Bristol City. During the match, Sadler came under criticism when he conceded two goals before being substituted at half–time. As a result, Sadler was sent to play for the reserve for the remainder of the season and made fifteen appearances.

In 2009–10 season, Sadler remained on the sidelines. In October 2009, Sadler went on trial at Huddersfield Town Sadler played for the club's reserve on 14 October 2009 against Grimsby Town's reserve, where he provided assist on one of the goal, with a 3–1 win. However, Huddersfield Town decided against signing Sadler. After this, Sadler appeared seven times as an unused substitute. Sadler then joined Stockport County on loan in January 2010 and remained at Edgeley Park until the end of the League One season. His debut for the club took place on 30 January against Southampton. Sadler became a first team regular for the club, where he made twenty appearances. However, despite Sadler's best effort, the club were later relegated to League Two.

Sadler joined League Two club Shrewsbury Town on 7 July 2010 on loan for six months. According to manager Graham Turner, the player seemed reluctant initially to play in the fourth tier of English football but was won over by the club's ambition. Sadler made his Shrewsbury Town debut in the opening game of the season, in a 3 – 1 win over Bradford City. In the next game, Sadler played a role for the club when he provided assist for Matt Harrold to score the only goal in the game in a 1–0 win over Macclesfield Town. Since then, Sadler made an impressive display at Shrewsbury Town, having established himself in the first team and expressed interests of extending his loan spell at the club for the remainder of the season. On 6 January 2011 saw Sadler's loan spell at Shrewsbury Town extended until the end of the season. During the match against Port Vale on 8 March 2011, Sadler controversially fouled Tom Pope in a penalty box, leading to a penalty kick converted successfully, which resulted a 2–2 draw. Despite this, Sadler went on to be an ever-present player in the League Two season to play every minute of every game for his club. Sadler played in two matches in the play–offs against Torquay United, but lost 2–0 in the first leg and drew 0–0 in the second leg.

At the end of the 2010–11 season, it was announced that Sadler was one of the three players released by the club.

Walsall

Despite Shrewsbury Town keen on signing him permanently, Sadler joined Walsall on 27 June 2011 on a one–year contract. Upon joining Walsall, Sadler said the move was a step to make a new start after lack of first team opportunity at Watford.

Sadler made his Walsall debut, in the opening game of the season, in a 1–0 win over Leyton Orient. In the next game against Hartlepool United seven days later, Sadler provided an assist when he was fouled in the penalty box, leading to penalty and was successfully converted by Jon Macken in a 1–1 draw. His impressive display in the first team lead to being praised by Manager Dean Smith, who gave him a nickname as 'Mr Reliable'. Then on 5 November 2011, Sadler provided assist for Jamie Paterson, in a 1–1 draw against Huddersfield Town to end three games without a point. However, in a 1–1 draw against Charlton Athletic on 10 December 2011, Sadler was sent–off after a second bookable offence in a last minutes and missed a match in the FA Cup second round replay against Dagenham & Redbridge, which saw Walsall lost in a penalty–shootout. Despite the suspension, Sadler remained in the first team and then scored his first goal for Walsall on 27 March 2012, in a 3–1 win over Colchester United in what BBC Sport described as "breaking one of football's longer droughts in his 193rd league game (also 222nd in all appearance". Then in the match against Huddersfield Town on 28 April 2012, Sadler provided assist for Florent Cuvelier, in a 1–1 draw, to ensure that the club will be playing in League One next season.
During the season, the club's struggling form in League One led Sadler commenting on the effect. Despite this, Sadler, once again, on to be an ever-present player in the League One season to play every minute of every game for his club and finished runner–up for the club's Player of the Year behind Andy Butler.

Despite impression display at the 2011–12 season, Sadler, was offered a new contract with the club and was encouraged to stay at the club by his teammate, Andy Butler.

Crawley Town
On 8 June 2012, Sadler joined newly promoted League One side Crawley Town on a free transfer after turning down a new two–year contract with the club. Upon joining the club, Sadler cited Manager Sean O'Driscoll's winning mentality as the reason he joined Crawley Town.

Sadler made his debut on 14 August, starting in a League Cup match as a left back against Championship side Millwall which ended 2–2, with Crawley winning 4–1 on penalties. Four days later, on 18 August 2012, Sadler made his league debut for Crawley Town, in the opening game of the season, in a 3–0 win over Scunthorpe United. Sadler then scored his first goal for the club on 5 March 2013, in a 1–1 draw against Carlisle United. In his first season at Crawley Town, Sadler went on to be an ever-present player in the League One season to play every minute of every game for his club, as he helped the club finish tenth place.

In the 2013–14 season, Sadler continued to regain his place in the first team, under the new management of Richie Barker. Sadler then score his first Crawley Town goal of the season on 17 August 2013, in a 2–1 loss against Rotherham United. Then on 21 September 2013, Sadler then provided assist for Emile Sinclair, in a 1–1 draw against Colchester United. Sadler made his 200th consecutive league appearance on 12 April 2014 against MK Dons. Like his first season at Crawley, Sadler was, once again, to be an ever-present player in the League One season to play every minute of every game for his club, as he helped the club finish fourteenth place.

At the end of the 2013–14 season, with his contract was about to run out, Sadler was among four players to be offered a new contract. However, due to weeks of delays, the club decided to withdraw the contract offer on Sadler and was released by the club in June. After leaving the club, Sadler was linked with a move to clubs around England and Scotland.

Rotherham United
Sadler joined newly promoted Championship side Rotherham United on a free transfer from Crawley Town on 17 June 2014. Upon joining the club, Sadler said he cannot wait to play in the Championship with the Rotherham United side.

After appearing five times in the pre–season friendly matches, it wasn't until on 26 August 2014 for Sadler made his Rotherham United debut in the second round of the League Cup, which saw them lost 1–0 against Swansea City. However, this turns out to be his only appearance in the League Cup, before returning to Crawley in September on loan. He was linked with a loan move to Notts County and Crewe Alexandra. Sadler then had a run in the first team, which lead to extending his loan spell for another month. After extending his loan spell, Sadler continued to remain in the first team before returning to his parent club on 13 November 2015.

When his loan expired, he returned to Rotherham, and made no further first-team appearances until joining Oldham Athletic on a month's loan in March 2015. Upon joining the club, Sadler was brought by Oldham Athletic as a replacement for Joseph Mills, who suffered a calf–injury. Sadler made his Oldham Athletic debut on 14 March 2015, in a 3–1 loss against Barnsley. Sadler then provided assist for Conor Wilkinson on 21 March 2015, to score the only goal in the game in a 1–0 win over Crewe Alexandra, to end the club's three match losing streak. After making eight appearances for the club, Sadler returned to his parent club on 13 April 2015.

At the end of the 2014–15 season, Sadler was released by the club.

Return to Shrewsbury

Following his release from Rotherham, Sadler signed for former loan club Shrewsbury Town in League One, on a two-year contract in May 2015.

Sadler's first game after signing for the club on a permanent basis came in the opening game of the season, in a 2–1 loss against Millwall. A regular in the side in the early part of the season, Sadler scored his first goal for the club in a 2–1 defeat to Chesterfield, but lost his place in the first-team after a run of poor personal form. Having been recalled for an FA Cup first round victory at non-league Gainsborough Trinity, he was praised for his "first class attitude" and determination by manager Micky Mellon. Sadler later scored his second goal of the season on 26 April 2016, in a 2–1 loss against Walsall.

Following a change in management early in the following season, Sadler found himself playing more often in a central defensive role under Paul Hurst. He was named team-captain for the first time, in the absence of Abu Ogogo and Adam El-Abd, in February 2017, and went on to win the Player of the year, Players' player of the year and Player in the community awards at the conclusion of the season, after helping Shrewsbury avoid relegation to League Two. Sadler subsequently signed a two-year contract extension, committing him to the club until summer 2019.

Ahead of the 2017–18 season, Sadler was appointed club captain, alongside team captain Abu Ogogo, leading the team to both the EFL Trophy final and the 2018 EFL League One play-off Final, although they ultimately finished as runners-up on both occasions.

Immediately after the final match of the 2018–19, Sadler revealed that he would be leaving the club at the end of his contract, having clocked up over 200 appearances in all competitions, over two separate spells.

Return to Walsall
On 11 July 2019, Sadler returned to former club Walsall following his release from Shrewsbury Town at the end of the 2018–19 season. 

Sadler announced his retirement at the end of the 2021–22 season.

International career
Sadler played nine times for England under-17, including at the 2002 European Under-17 championships, appeared once for the under-18s, and played four times at under-19 level.

Personal life
Sadler said in 2012 that when he retired from playing football, he might go back to education to get a degree. He co-founded a property investment company in 2017 while still playing for Shrewsbury Town.

Career statistics

Honours
Shrewsbury Town
EFL Trophy runner-up: 2017–18

References

External links
Mat Sadler profile at the Shrewsbury Town F.C. website

1985 births
Living people
Footballers from Birmingham, West Midlands
English footballers
England youth international footballers
Association football defenders
Birmingham City F.C. players
Northampton Town F.C. players
Watford F.C. players
Stockport County F.C. players
Shrewsbury Town F.C. players
Walsall F.C. players
Crawley Town F.C. players
Rotherham United F.C. players
Oldham Athletic A.F.C. players
Premier League players
English Football League players